Ritual. is the debut album by Czech black metal band Master's Hammer, initially released through independent label Monitor in 1991. It was later distributed elsewhere and re-released in CD format by Osmose Productions in 1994; Osmose's version contains two bonus tracks. Many tracks of the album were re-recorded from their 1990 demo tape The Fall of Idol.

The track "Jáma pekel" would eventually be re-recorded for Master's Hammer's 2009 album Mantras.

Music videos were made for the tracks "Černá svatozář" and "Géniové".

The track "Útok" was dedicated to Church of Satan founder Anton LaVey.

Covers
Polish blackened death metal band Behemoth covered "Jáma pekel" on their 2008 EP Ezkaton. Their version counted with a guest appearance by Root vocalist Jiří "Big Boss" Valter.

Critical reception
The band once claimed that Ritual. sold over 25,000 copies in the Czech Republic alone. It is considered to be one of the major albums responsible for defining the early Czech black metal scene of the late 1980s/early to mid-1990s, alongside Root's Zjevení (1990) and Maniac Butcher's Barbarians (1995).

Rock Hard magazine featured Ritual. on their list "250 Black Metal Albums You Should Know".

Fenriz of the band Darkthrone called it "the first Norwegian black metal album, even though they are from Czechoslovakia".

Track listing

Personnel
 František "Franta" Štorm – vocals, guitars, photography, cover art
 Tomáš "Necrocock" Kohout – guitars
 Tomáš "Monster" Vendl – bass
 Miroslav "Mirek" Valenta – drums
 Honza "Silenthell" Přibyl – timpani
 Vlastimil "Vlasta" Voral – keyboards
 Milan Fibiger – bass (on tracks 6, 7, 8 and 10)
 Miloš "Dodo" Doležal – production

References

1991 debut albums
Master's Hammer albums